Events from the year 1958 in Canada.

Incumbents

Crown 
 Monarch – Elizabeth II

Federal government 
 Governor General – Vincent Massey
 Prime Minister – John Diefenbaker
 Chief Justice – Patrick Kerwin (Ontario)
 Parliament – 23rd (until 1 February) then 24th (from 12 May)

Provincial governments

Lieutenant governors 
Lieutenant Governor of Alberta – John J. Bowlen
Lieutenant Governor of British Columbia – Frank Mackenzie Ross
Lieutenant Governor of Manitoba – John Stewart McDiarmid
Lieutenant Governor of New Brunswick – David Laurence MacLaren (until June 5) then Joseph Leonard O'Brien
Lieutenant Governor of Newfoundland – Campbell Leonard Macpherson 
Lieutenant Governor of Nova Scotia – Alistair Fraser (until January 15) then Edward Chester Plow 
Lieutenant Governor of Ontario – John Keiller MacKay 
Lieutenant Governor of Prince Edward Island – Thomas William Lemuel Prowse (until March 31) then Frederick Walter Hyndman
Lieutenant Governor of Quebec – Gaspard Fauteux (until February 14) then Onésime Gagnon
Lieutenant Governor of Saskatchewan – William John Patterson (until February 3) then Frank Lindsay Bastedo

Premiers 
Premier of Alberta – Ernest Manning
Premier of British Columbia – W.A.C. Bennett 
Premier of Manitoba – Douglas Campbell (until June 30) then Dufferin Roblin
Premier of New Brunswick – Hugh John Flemming
Premier of Newfoundland – Joey Smallwood 
Premier of Nova Scotia – Robert Stanfield 
Premier of Ontario – Leslie Frost 
Premier of Prince Edward Island – Alex Matheson 
Premier of Quebec – Maurice Duplessis 
Premier of Saskatchewan – Tommy Douglas

Territorial governments

Commissioners 
 Commissioner of Yukon – Frederick Howard Collins 
 Commissioner of Northwest Territories – Robert Gordon Robertson

Events
January 16 – Louis St. Laurent is replaced by Lester B. Pearson as leader of the Liberal Party
February 19–20 – Rt Hon Ellen Fairclough first woman to assume the duties of Prime Minister for two days during John Diefenbaker's absence from the country.
March 25 – The Avro Arrow flies for the first time
March 31 – John Diefenbaker leads the Progressive Conservative Party of Canada  to a massive election victory.
April 5 – The Seymour Narrows is made more easily passable after Ripple Rock was destroyed in one of the largest planned non-nuclear explosions
May 12 – The North American Aerospace Defense Command (NORAD) agreement is signed between the United States and Canada.
June 17 – The Second Narrows Bridge in Vancouver collapses killing 18.
June 30 – Duff Roblin sworn in as premier of Manitoba
July 1 – Canada-wide television broadcasting starts
July 1 – The Lost Villages in Ontario are permanently flooded as part of the St. Lawrence Seaway construction project.
October 22 – Canada appoints, Margaret Meagher, the country's first female ambassador, to Israel.
October 23 – The third Springhill Mining Disaster occurs killing 74.

Full date unknown
Ellen Fairclough becomes Canada's first federal female cabinet minister.
Department of Physical Education started at the University of Saskatchewan

Arts and literature
July 16 – The Manitoba Theatre Centre opens.

New works
John Kenneth Galbraith's The Affluent Society
Farley Mowat's Coppermine Journey: An Account of a Great Adventure
Antonine Maillet's first novel Pointe-aux-Coques

Awards
See 1958 Governor General's Awards for a complete list of winners and finalists for those awards.
Stephen Leacock Award: Eric Nicol, Girdle Me A Globe

Film
Morley Callaghan's Now That April's Here is made into a feature film
Allan Dwan directs his last film Enchanted Island

Music
Paul Anka has four hit singles and becomes one of the most popular singers in the world.

Television

Sport
January 17 - The Canadian Football League is established with 9 teams (Hamilton Tiger-Cats, Ottawa Rough Riders, Toronto Argonauts, Saskatchewan Roughriders, Winnipeg Blue Bombers, Edmonton Eskimos, Montreal Alouettes, Calgary Stampeders, and BC Lions)
April 20 – Montreal Canadiens won their Tenth (and Third consecutive) Stanley Cup by defeating the Boston Bruins 4 games to 2.
May 6 - Ottawa-Hull Canadiens won their Second (and only in Ottawa) Memorial Cup by defeating the Saskatchewan Junior Hockey League's Regina Pats 4 games to 2. The deciding Game 6 was played at Ottawa Auditorium
November 29 – Winnipeg Blue Bombers won their Fourth Grey Cup by defeating the Hamilton Tiger-Cats 35–28 in the 46th Grey Cup played at Empire Stadium in Vancouver

Births

January to June
January 10 – Terrence Scammell, voice director and voice actor
January 29 – Glen Cochrane, ice hockey player and scout
February 15 – Peter Butler, long-distance runner
February 23 – Bob Stephen, Canadian football player (d. 2009)

March 8 – Raymond Simard, politician
March 30 – Maurice LaMarche, voice actor
April 7 – Ted Nolan, ice hockey player and coach
April 15 – Keith Acton, ice hockey player and coach
April 17 – Laslo Babits, javelin thrower
May 10 – Gaétan Boucher, speed skater and double Olympic gold medallist
May 13 – Claire Backhouse-Sharpe, badminton player
May 18 – Bob Chaperon, snooker and billiards player
June 24 – Jean Charest, lawyer and politician, 29th Premier of Quebec

July to September

July 12 – Tonya Lee Williams, actress
July 28 – Terry Fox, humanitarian, athlete and cancer treatment activist (d. 1981)
August 6 – Lorne Saxberg, television journalist and news anchor (d. 2006)
August 15 – Craig MacTavish, ice hockey player and coach
August 17 – Kirk Stevens, snooker player
August 19 – Darryl Sutter, ice hockey player and coach
August 22 - Colm Feore, American-born stage, film and television actor
August 29 – Linda Staudt, long-distance runner
September 7 – Peter Mettler, filmmaker
September 8 – Stevie Vallance, actress, voice actress, stage performer, singer, casting director and voice director
September 11 – Jeffrey A. Hutchings, fisheries scientist (d. 2022)
September 16 – Jennifer Tilly, actress and poker player
September 17 – Monte Solberg, politician and businessman
September 25 – Rob McCall, ice dancer (d. 1991)
September 28 – Angella Taylor-Issajenko, sprinter

October to December
October 8 – Neile Graham, poet and scholar
November 3 – Kevin Sorenson, politician
November 6 – Kevin Doherty, judoka
November 19 – Joe Jordan, politician
December 10 – David Paul Grove, actor and voice actor
December 12 – Lucie Guay, canoe racer
December 24 – Lyse Doucet, journalist and broadcaster
December 25 – Alannah Myles, singer-songwriter

Full date unknown
John Colapinto, journalist, author and novelist
Kim Rabot (d. 1975)
Gordon Stewart Anderson, writer (d. 1991)

Deaths

January to June
January 7 – Margaret Anglin, actress, director and producer (b. 1876)
January 8 – John Duff, race car driver (b. 1895)
January 16 – Charles Bélec, politician (b. 1872)
April 1 – J. Arthur Ross, politician (b. 1893)
May 12 – Lewis Stubbs, judge and politician (b. 1878)
June 26 – George Orton, middle-distance runner and Olympic gold medallist, first Canadian to win an Olympic medal (b. 1873)

July to December

July 21 – Joseph Oscar Lefebre Boulanger, politician and lawyer (b. 1888)
September 2 – George Stewart Henry, politician and 10th Premier of Ontario (b. 1871)
September 11 – Camillien Houde, politician and four-time mayor of Montreal (b. 1889)
September 11 – Robert W. Service, poet and writer (b. 1874)
October 2 – Charles Avery Dunning, politician, Minister and university chancellor (b. 1885)
November 10 – Billy Boucher, ice hockey player (b. 1899)

See also 
 List of Canadian films

References 

 
Years of the 20th century in Canada
Canada
1958 in North America